Maria Rohm (13 August 1945 – 18 June 2018) was an Austrian actress and producer.

Born Helga Grohmann in Vienna, she started her acting career at the very young age, working at the famous Viennese Burgtheatre as a child actor from ages 4 through 13. She continued her theatrical work until the age of 18 when she auditioned for British film producer, Harry Alan Towers, whom she would later marry. Working with Towers she became famous for appearing in a number of films directed by Jesús Franco in the late 1960s, including Venus in Furs, The Bloody Judge and Count Dracula.

Personal life
Rohm remained married to Towers from 1964 until his death in 2009. She retired from acting in 1976, but continued to produce independent films.

Death
Rohm died in Toronto on 18 June 2018 at 72. She had been hospitalized for paralysis in the legs after collapsing to the ground. The tests led to the discovery of acute leukemia and a tumor pressing against her spine (which caused the paralysis), although Rohm remained convinced that she was suffering from sciatica. Her condition rapidly deteriorated and she died a few days after entering the hospital.

Filmography

References

External links
  Dead link 14 May 2020.
 

1945 births
2018 deaths
Austrian film actresses
Austrian film producers
Austrian women film producers
Actresses from Vienna
20th-century Austrian actresses